PAS domain-containing serine/threonine-protein kinase is an enzyme that in humans is encoded by the PASK gene.

PAS domains regulate the function of many intracellular signaling pathways in response to both extrinsic and intrinsic stimuli. PASK is an evolutionarily conserved protein present in yeast, flies, and mammals.[supplied by OMIM]

References

Further reading

EC 2.7.11
PAS-domain-containing proteins